Ivar Giaever (born April 5, 1929) is a Norwegian-American engineer and physicist who shared the Nobel Prize in Physics in 1973 with Leo Esaki and Brian Josephson "for their discoveries regarding tunnelling phenomena in solids". Giaever's share of the prize was specifically for his "experimental discoveries regarding tunnelling phenomena in superconductors".

In 1975, he was elected as a member into the National Academy of Engineering for contributions in the discovery and elaboration of electron tunneling into superconductors.

Giaever is a professor emeritus at the Rensselaer Polytechnic Institute and the president of the company Applied Biophysics.

Early life 
Giaever earned a degree in mechanical engineering from the Norwegian Institute of Technology in Trondheim in 1952. In 1954, he emigrated from Norway to Canada, where he was employed by the Canadian division of General Electric. He moved to the United States four years later, joining General Electric's Corporate Research and Development Center in Schenectady, New York, in 1958.  He has lived in Niskayuna, New York, since then, taking up US citizenship in 1964.  While working for General Electric, Giaever earned a Ph.D. degree at the Rensselaer Polytechnic Institute in 1964.

The Nobel Prize 
The work that led to Giaever's Nobel Prize was performed at General Electric in 1960. Following on Esaki's discovery of electron tunnelling in semiconductors in 1958, Giaever showed that tunnelling also took place in superconductors, demonstrating tunnelling through a very thin layer of oxide surrounded on both sides by metal in a superconducting or normal state. Giaever's experiments demonstrated the existence of an energy gap in superconductors, one of the most important predictions of the BCS theory of superconductivity, which had been developed in 1957.  Giaever's experimental demonstration of tunnelling in superconductors stimulated the theoretical physicist Brian Josephson to work on the phenomenon, leading to his prediction of the Josephson effect in 1962.  Esaki and Giaever shared half of the 1973 Nobel Prize, and Josephson received the other half.

Giaever's research later in his career was mainly in the field of biophysics.  In 1969, he researched biophysics for a year as a fellow at Clare Hall, University of Cambridge, through a Guggenheim Fellowship, and he continued to work in this area after he returned to the US.

He has co-signed a letter from over 70 Nobel laureate scientists to the Louisiana Legislature supporting the repeal of Louisiana’s Louisiana Science Education Act.

Other prizes 
In addition to the Nobel Prize, he has also been awarded the Oliver E. Buckley Prize by the American Physical Society in 1965, the Golden Plate Award of the American Academy of Achievement in 1966, and the Zworykin Award by the National Academy of Engineering in 1975.

In 1985, he was awarded an honorary degree, doctor honoris causa, at the Norwegian Institute of Technology, later part of Norwegian University of Science and Technology.

He is a member of the Norwegian Academy of Science and Letters.

Global warming 
Giaever has repeatedly professed skepticism of global warming, calling it a "new religion".

On 13 September 2011, Giaever resigned from the American Physical Society over its official position. The APS Fellow noted: "In the APS it is ok to discuss whether the mass of the proton changes over time and how a multi-universe behaves, but the evidence of global warming is incontrovertible?"

Giaever is currently a science advisor with American conservative and libertarian think tank The Heartland Institute.

Personal life
Giaever married his childhood sweetheart Inger Skramstad in 1952. They have four children: John, Anne, Guri and Trine. Giaever is an atheist.

Selected publications 
 
 
 
  Giaever, Ivar (2016). "I Am The Smartest Man I Know": A Nobel Laureate's Difficult Journey, World Scientific. .

References

External links 

 Interview with Professor Ivar Giaever, from the Official Nobel Prize Website
  including the Nobel Lecture, December 12, 1973 Electron Tunneling and Superconductivity
 University of Oslo website about Ivar Giaever
Family genealogy

1929 births
Living people
Norwegian physicists
Members of the United States National Academy of Sciences
Nobel laureates in Physics
American atheists
American Nobel laureates
Norwegian Nobel laureates
Rensselaer Polytechnic Institute faculty
Rensselaer Polytechnic Institute alumni
Fellows of Clare Hall, Cambridge
Alumni of Clare Hall, Cambridge
Norwegian Institute of Technology alumni
Hamar Katedralskole alumni
Norwegian emigrants to the United States
Members of the Norwegian Academy of Science and Letters
Engineers from Bergen
Norwegian atheists
General Electric people
Royal Norwegian Society of Sciences and Letters
Semiconductor physicists
Condensed matter physicists
American biophysicists
Oliver E. Buckley Condensed Matter Prize winners
Fellows of the American Physical Society